The Miss Earth México 2009, the eighth edition of the pageant, was held at the Yucatán Siglo XXI Convention Centre in Mérida, Yucatán, México on September 29, 2009. Thirty-two delegates competed for the national title, which was won by Natalia Quiñonez from Jalisco. Quiñonez was crowned by Miss Earth México 2008, Abigail Elizalde from Coahuila.

Miss Earth México 2009 represented the country in the international Miss Earth 2009.

Results

See also
Miss Earth Mexico

References

External links
Official Website

2009
2009 in Mexico
2009 beauty pageants